Parcz  (German Partsch, sometimes Gross-Partsch) is a village in the administrative district of Gmina Kętrzyn, within Kętrzyn County, Warmian-Masurian Voivodeship, in northern Poland.

One of Adolf Hitler's food tasters, Margot Wölk, lived here for a time, after her house in Berlin was bombed in 1942.

References

Parcz